Lenilson Batista de Jesús (born May 1, 1981 in Salvador), also known as Lenilson Batista de Souza, Lenilson Batista, or simply Lenílson, is a Brazilian left midfielder.

References

1981 births
Living people
Brazilian footballers
Brazilian expatriate footballers
América Futebol Clube (MG) players
Clube Atlético Mineiro players
Marília Atlético Clube players
Esporte Clube Noroeste players
São Paulo FC players
Duque de Caxias Futebol Clube players
Tupi Football Club players
Esporte Clube XV de Novembro (Piracicaba) players
Esporte Clube Vitória players
Guaratinguetá Futebol players
Clube Atlético Linense players
Paraná Clube players
Botafogo Futebol Clube (PB) players
Chiapas F.C. footballers
Campeonato Brasileiro Série A players
Liga MX players
Expatriate footballers in Mexico
Association football midfielders
Sportspeople from Salvador, Bahia